Cerrone is a French disco drummer, composer, record producer and creator of concert shows, born Marc Cerrone.

Cerrone may also refer to:

Dominick Cerrone, Director of Culinary Arts at The French Culinary Institute in New York City
Donald Cerrone (born 1983), American mixed martial artist and kickboxer
Mike Cerrone (born 1957), American actor and screenwriter
Pascal Cerrone (born 1981), Swiss footballer
Supernature (Cerrone III), album by Cerrone
Cerrone IV, long title Cerrone IV: The Golden Touch, album by Cerrone